Igualapa is one of the 81 municipalities of Guerrero, in south-western Mexico. The municipal seat lies at Igualapa.  The municipality covers an area of 266.7 km².

As of 2005, the municipality had a total population of 10,312.

References

Municipalities of Guerrero